Brian Herbert Lesher (born March 5, 1971) is a Belgian former professional baseball outfielder. He played in Major League Baseball (MLB) for the Oakland Athletics, Seattle Mariners, and Toronto Blue Jays.

Lesher was born in Belgium where his father, John, a former West Virginia Mountaineers basketball player, was playing professional basketball.

Lesher entered the majors in 1996 with the Oakland Athletics, playing for three consecutive years before joining the Seattle Mariners and Toronto Blue Jays (2002). Brian is the only person born in Belgium to play Major League Baseball.

In a five-season career, Lesher was a .224 hitter (59-for-263) with nine home runs and 38 RBI in 108 games.

References

External links

1971 births
Living people
Edmonton Trappers players
Major League Baseball outfielders
Major League Baseball players from Belgium
Oakland Athletics players
People from Wilrijk
Seattle Mariners players
Tacoma Rainiers players
Toronto Blue Jays players
Huntsville Stars players
Indianapolis Indians players
Madison Muskies players
Memphis Redbirds players
Modesto A's players
Southern Oregon A's players
Syracuse SkyChiefs players
Vancouver Canadians players
American expatriate baseball players in Canada
Delaware Fightin' Blue Hens baseball players
Baseball players from Delaware